The RSA Judicial Building, also known as RSA Dexter Avenue Building, is office high-rise in Montgomery, Alabama owned by Retirement Systems of Alabama (RSA) completed in 2011. Built on the grounds of the former home of the Alabama Supreme Court its incorporates the 1926 three-story courthouse complex called the Judicial Building within its  glass atrium..

Alabama Supreme Court building
The earlier building was built in 1926 as the Scottish Rite Temple with an Egyptian motif. It was sold to the state in 1932 and became home to the Alabama Supreme Court and the Alabama' appellate courts and was called the Judicial Building. It was remodeled in 1938 in a Works Progress Administration project when the exterior was stripped and modernized. It was vacated and fell into disuse after the court system relocated to the newly-built Alabama Judicial Building circa 1994.

RSA building
The Retirement Systems of Alabama (RSA) project for a new building began in 2007. Its design and location were a source of controversy for its height, the preservation of the courthouse and the effect it have of streetscape and views of the Alabama State Capitol. While Montgomery's city planning code prohibits structures along Dexter Avenue taller than six stories, state buildings are exempt from the regulation.

 While the is exterior steps were removed, a fully restored historic Alabama Supreme Court Building was incorporated into the new structure is highlighted in  glass atrium.

Inside the atrium is an "honor court" with statues of the Alabama Supreme Court chief justices who served in the older building. The building also houses a datacenter for the region.

See also
List of tallest buildings in Montgomery, Alabama
RSA Trustmark Building
RSA Battle House Tower

References

External links
Judicial Building 1955
RSA Building atrium
Urban Planet

Buildings and structures in Montgomery, Alabama
State government buildings in Alabama